D.C. is an American drama television series that ran from April 2 to 23, 2000 on The WB. The series followed five young interns in Washington, D.C. as they navigate their careers and lives in the nation's capital.

Initially titled D.C. Interns, the series was given a 13-episode order in May 1999 to debut as a midseason replacement. However, on November 17, 1999, The WB announced that the series' 13-episode order was reduced to seven – effectively shutting down production – due to the success of the network's fall lineup, and the departure of creator John August.

Cast and characters
 Gabriel Olds as Mason Scott, a young man fresh out of college who has dreamed his entire life of coming to the city to make a difference.
 Mark-Paul Gosselaar as Pete Komisky, Mason's best friend and a lobbyist who understands the questionable morality of the political system in D.C.
 Jacinda Barrett as Finley Scott, Mason's sister who dropped out of graduate school.
 Daniel Sunjata as Lewis Freeman, a Supreme Court clerk.
 Kristanna Loken as Sarah Logan, Lewis's girlfriend and a junior field producer for a cable news station.

Recurring
John Benjamin Hickey as Congressman Rob Owens
Kenneth Welsh as Neil
Daniel McDonald as Dryder

Notable Guest Stars
Len Cariou as Senator William Abbott ("Pilot")
Tom McCarthy as Joseph Scott ("Truth")
Melissa McCarthy as Molly ("Justice", "Blame")
Joanna Cassidy as Lewis' boss ("Justice")

Episodes

References

External links

Television series by Universal Television
2000 American television series debuts
2000 American television series endings
The WB original programming
2000s American drama television series
English-language television shows
Television shows set in Washington, D.C.